Qazqapan (also Romanized as Qazqāpān) is a village in Piran Rural District, in the Central District of Piranshahr County, West Azerbaijan Province, Iran. At the 2006 census, its population was 229, in 34 families.

References 

Populated places in Piranshahr County